Wag the Dog is a 1997 American political satire black comedy film produced and directed by Barry Levinson and starring Dustin Hoffman and Robert De Niro. The film centers on a spin doctor and a Hollywood producer who fabricate a war in Albania to distract voters from a presidential sex scandal. The screenplay by Hilary Henkin and David Mamet was loosely adapted from Larry Beinhart's 1993 novel, American Hero.

Wag the Dog was released one month before the outbreak of the Clinton–Lewinsky scandal and the subsequent bombing of the Al-Shifa pharmaceutical factory in Sudan by the Clinton administration in August 1998, which prompted the media to draw comparisons between the film and reality. The comparison was also made in December 1998 when the administration initiated a bombing campaign of Iraq during Clinton's impeachment trial over the Clinton–Lewinsky scandal. It was made again in the spring of 1999 when the administration intervened in the Kosovo War and initiated a bombing campaign against Yugoslavia, which coincidentally bordered Albania and contained ethnic Albanians. The film grossed $64.3 million on a $15 million budget and was well received by critics, who praised the direction, performances, themes, and humor. Hoffman received a nomination for the Academy Award for Best Actor for his performance and screenwriters David Mamet and Hilary Henkin were both nominated for Best Adapted Screenplay.

Plot
The president is caught making advances on an underage girl inside the Oval Office, less than two weeks before the election. Conrad Brean, a top spin doctor, is brought in by presidential aide Winifred Ames to take the public's attention away from the scandal. He decides to construct a fictional war in Albania, hoping the media will concentrate on this instead. Brean contacts Hollywood producer Stanley Motss to create the war, complete with a theme song and fake film footage of a fleeing orphan to arouse sympathy. The hoax is initially successful, with the president quickly gaining ground in the polls.

When the CIA learns of the plot, they send Agent Young to confront Brean about the hoax. Brean convinces Young that revealing the deception is against his and the CIA's best interests. But when the CIA — in collusion with the president's rival candidate — reports that the war has ended, the media begins to focus back on the president's sexual abuse scandal. To counter this, Motss invents a hero who was left behind enemy lines in Albania. Inspired by the idea that he was "discarded like an old shoe", Brean and Motss ask the Pentagon to provide a special forces soldier with a matching name (a sergeant named "Schumann" is identified) around whom a POW narrative can be constructed. As part of the hoax, folk singer Johnny Dean records a song called "Old Shoe", which is pressed onto a 78 rpm record, prematurely aged so that listeners will think it was recorded years earlier, and sent to the Library of Congress to be "found".  Soon, large numbers of old pairs of shoes begin appearing on phone and power lines, and a grassroots movement takes hold.

When the team goes to retrieve Schumann, they discover he is in fact a criminally insane Army convict. On the way back, their plane crashes en route to Andrews Air Force Base. The team survives and is rescued by a farmer, an illegal alien who is given expedited citizenship for a better story. However, Schumann is killed after he attempts to rape a gas station owner's daughter. Seizing the opportunity, Motss stages an elaborate military funeral for Schumann, claiming that he died from wounds sustained during his rescue.

While watching a political talk show, Motss gets frustrated that the media are crediting the president's upsurge in the polls to the bland campaign slogan of "Don't change horses in mid-stream" rather than to Motss's hard work. Motss states that he wants credit and will reveal his involvement, despite Brean's offer of an ambassadorship and the dire warning that he is "playing with his life". After Motss refuses to change his mind, Brean reluctantly orders his security staff to kill him. A newscast reports that Motss has died of a heart attack at home, the president was successfully re-elected, and an Albanian terrorist organization has claimed responsibility for a recent bombing.

Cast

Production

Title
The title of the film comes from the idiomatic English-language expression "the tail wagging the dog", which is referenced at the beginning of the film by a caption that reads:

Motss and Evans
Hoffman's character, Stanley Motss, is said to have been based directly upon famed producer Robert Evans. Similarities have been noted between the character and Evans' work habits, mannerisms, quirks, clothing style, hairstyle, and large, square-framed eyeglasses; in fact, the real Evans is said to have joked, "I'm magnificent in this film." Hoffman has never discussed any inspiration Evans may have provided for the role, and claims on the commentary track for the film's DVD release that much of Motss' characterization was based on Hoffman's father, Harry Hoffman, a former prop manager for Columbia Pictures.

Writing credits
The award of writing credits on the film became controversial at the time, due to objections by Barry Levinson. After Levinson became attached as director, David Mamet was hired to rewrite Hilary Henkin's screenplay, which was loosely adapted from Larry Beinhart's novel American Hero.

Given the close relationship between Levinson and Mamet, New Line Cinema asked that Mamet be given sole credit for the screenplay. However, the Writers Guild of America intervened on Henkin's behalf to ensure that Henkin received first-position shared screenplay credit, finding that—as the original screenwriter—Henkin had created the screenplay's structure as well as much of the screen story and dialogue.

Levinson thereafter threatened to (but did not) quit the Guild, claiming that Mamet had written all of the dialogue as well as creating the characters of Motss and Schumann, and had originated most of the scenes set in Hollywood and all of the scenes set in Nashville. Levinson attributed the numerous similarities between Henkin's original version and the eventual shooting script to Henkin and Mamet working from the same novel, but the WGA disagreed in its credit arbitration ruling.

Music

The film featured many songs created for the fictitious campaign waged by the protagonists; these songs include "Good Old Shoe", "The American Dream", and "The Men of the 303". However, none of these pieces made it onto the soundtrack CD. The CD featured only the title track (by British guitarist/vocalist Mark Knopfler) and seven of Knopfler's instrumentals.

Songs as listed in the film's credits
 "Thank Heaven for Little Girls": written by Lerner and Lowe, performed by Maurice Chevalier
 "I Guard the Canadian Border": written by Tom Bähler and Willie Nelson, performed by Nelson
 "The American Dream": written by Bähler, performed by Bähler
 "Good Old Shoe": written by Edgar Winter, performed by Nelson and Pops Staples
 "Classical Allegro": written by Marc Ferrari and Nancy Hieronymous
 "Courage Mom": written by Merle Haggard and performed by Merle Haggard and the Strangers
 "Barracuda": written by Heart, referenced by Woody Harrelson in character
 "I Love the Nightlife": written by Alicia Bridges and Susan Hutcheson
 "God Bless the Men of the 303": written by Huey Lewis, performed by Lewis, Scott Mathews, and Johnny Colla
 "Wag the Dog": written and performed by Mark Knopfler

Reception
On Rotten Tomatoes, Wag the Dog has an approval rating of 86% based on 76 reviews, with an average rating of 7.4/10. The site's critical consensus reads, "Smart, well-acted, and uncomfortably prescient political satire from director Barry Levinson and an all-star cast." On Metacritic, which assigns a weighted average rating, the film has a score of 73 out of 100, based on 22 critics, indicating "generally favorable reviews".

Roger Ebert awarded the film four out of four stars and wrote in his review for the Chicago Sun-Times, "The movie is a satire that contains just enough realistic ballast to be teasingly plausible; like Dr. Strangelove, it makes you laugh, and then it makes you wonder." He ranked it as his tenth favorite film of 1997.
Ann Hornaday of The Washington Post rated it at number 12 on her list of the best political movies ever made.

Accolades

Home media
Wag the Dog was released VHS on November 3, 1998, and on DVD on November 15, 2005. It is not available on Blu-ray.

Television adaptation
On April 27, 2017, Deadline reported that Barry Levinson, Robert De Niro, and Tom Fontana were developing a television series based on the film for HBO. De Niro's Tribeca Productions was to co-produce along with Levinson and Fontana's company.

"Wag the dog" term and usage

The political phrase wag the dog is used to indicate that attention is purposely being diverted from something of greater importance to something of lesser importance. The idiom stems from the 1870s. In a local newspaper, The Daily Republican: "Calling to mind Lord Dundreary's conundrum, the Baltimore American thinks that for the Cincinnati Convention to control the Democratic party would be the 'tail wagging the dog'."

The phrase, then and now, indicates a backwards situation in which a small and seemingly unimportant entity (the tail) controls a bigger, more important one (the dog). It was again used in the 1960s. The film became a "reality" the year after it was released, due to the Clinton–Lewinsky scandal. Days after the scandal broke, President Bill Clinton ordered missile strikes against two countries, Afghanistan and Sudan. During his impeachment proceedings, Clinton also bombed Iraq, drawing further "wag the dog" accusations and with the scandal still on the public's mind in March 1999, his administration launched a bombing campaign against Yugoslavia.

See also

 Astroturfing, a controversial public relations practice depicted in the film
 Canadian Bacon and Wrong Is Right, films about an American war started for similar reasons

References

External links

 
 
 
 
 

1997 films
1990s black comedy films
1990s political films
American black comedy films
American political satire films
1990s English-language films
Films about television
Films about elections
Films about fictional presidents of the United States
Films about journalists
Films based on American novels
Films directed by Barry Levinson
Films produced by Robert De Niro
Films set in Washington, D.C.
Films shot in Washington, D.C.
Films with screenplays by David Mamet
New Line Cinema films
Silver Bear Grand Jury Prize winners
1997 comedy films
Films about media manipulation
Films about conspiracy theories
1990s American films